Daniela Drummond-Barbosa is a Brazilian-American geneticist who is a Professor of Biochemistry and Molecular Biology at the Johns Hopkins Bloomberg School of Public Health. Her research considers stem cell regulation.

Early life and education 
Drummond-Barbosa grew up in Belo Horizonte in Brazil. She earned her undergraduate degree in biological sciences at the Federal University of Minas Gerais in 1991. She moved to New Haven, Connecticut for her graduate studies, where she worked with Daniel DiMaio on the interactions between platelet-derived growth factor receptors and the bovine papillomavirus E5 protein. She joined the laboratory of Allan C. Spradling at the Carnegie Institution for Science for her postdoctoral research. Here she first identified that stem cells and their derivatives responded to diet.

Research and career 
Drummond-Barbosa continued to study the regulation of stem cells as she started her independent career at Vanderbilt University. She focused on how germline stem cells are regulated by diet and the control of meiotic maturation in Drosophila. In 2009 Drummond-Barbosa was appointed to Johns Hopkins Bloomberg School of Public Health. Her research considers how adult stem cells sense and respond to external and systemic environments. She has focused on the ovarian stem cells of Drosophila and how they respond to diet, concentrating on hormones, insulin and adipose tissue.

Awards 
 1990 Conselho Nacional de Pesquisas Scientific Initiation Fellowship
 1997 National Institutes of Health National Research Service Award
 2006 Vanderbilt University Chancellor's Award for Research
 2007 American Cancer Society Research Scholar
 2014 Elected Fellow of the American Association for the Advancement of Science
 2017 Johns Hopkins University Shikani/El Hibri Prize for Discovery & Innovation

Selected publications

References 

Living people
Year of birth missing (living people)
People from Belo Horizonte
Johns Hopkins Bloomberg School of Public Health faculty